Chaetodontoplus poliourus, the greytail angelfish, is a species of marine fish belonging to the family Pomacanthidae. It is similar to its sister species Chaetodontoplus mesoleucus, and the two were considered as being the same species for a long time. However, they can be readily distinguished by the color of their tails: C. poliurus has a grey tail, whereas C. mesoleucus has a yellow tail. The Greytail Angelfish can be found in inshore reefs and lagoons of the western Pacific, from Indonesia to Palau and Solomon Islands. It's rare in the aquarium trade, but highly sought after, and listed as Least Concern by the IUCN Red List.

References 

Fish described in 2009
Taxa named by John Ernest Randall
Taxa named by Luiz A. Rocha
Chaetodontoplus